Pirdop Gate (Pirdopska Porta \pir-'dop-ska 'por-ta\) is a 300-m wide pass between Maritsa Peak and Atanasoff Nunatak in eastern Bowles Ridge, Livingston Island in the South Shetland Islands, Antarctica. It has an elevation of 376 m at its northern entrance from Struma Glacier, and 261 m at the southern entrance from Huron Glacier. It forms part of an overland route between middle Huron Glacier and upper Kaliakra Glacier.  The pass was first crossed by the Bulgarians Lyubomir Ivanov and Doychin Vasilev from Camp Academia on 28 December 2004.  Named after the town of Pirdop in Central Bulgaria.

Location

Maps
 L.L. Ivanov et al. Antarctica: Livingston Island and Greenwich Island, South Shetland Islands. Scale 1:100000 topographic map. Sofia: Antarctic Place-names Commission of Bulgaria, 2005.
 L.L. Ivanov. Antarctica: Livingston Island and Greenwich, Robert, Snow and Smith Islands. Scale 1:120000 topographic map.  Troyan: Manfred Wörner Foundation, 2009.  
 A. Kamburov and L. Ivanov. Bowles Ridge and Central Tangra Mountains: Livingston Island, Antarctica. Scale 1:25000 map. Sofia: Manfred Wörner Foundation, 2023.

References
 Pirdop Gate. SCAR Composite Antarctic Gazetteer
 Bulgarian Antarctic Gazetteer. Antarctic Place-names Commission. (details in Bulgarian, basic data in English)

External links
 Pirdop Gate. Copernix satellite image

Mountain passes of Livingston Island